The District Heights–Suitland Line, designated Route V12, is a daily bus route operated by the Washington Metropolitan Area Transit Authority between the Addison Road station of the Blue & Silver Lines of the Washington Metro and Suitland station of the Green Line of the Washington Metro. The line operates every 30–40 minutes on weekdays and 60 minutes on weekends. V12 trips are roughly 35 minutes long.

Background
Route V12 operates daily between Addison Road station and Suitland station connecting Capitol Heights, Coral Hills, Walker Mill, District Heights, Suitland neighborhoods to both stations. Route V12 currently operates out of Landover division.

History
Route V12 was created as a brand new Metrobus route by WMATA on December 3, 1978 to replace the former B12 Metrobus route that was discontinued. Unlike the B12 which operated between Federal Triangle in Downtown Washington D.C. (11th Street NW and E Street NW) & the Penn Mar Shopping Center, V12 would operate as part of the Pennsylvania Avenue-Maryland Line, between the newly opened Potomac Avenue station & Penn Mar Shopping Center, via Potomac Avenue, Pennsylvania Avenue, and Donnell Drive. The B12 former routing between the intersection of Potomac Avenue SE & Pennsylvania Avenue SE and Federal Triangle was replaced by the Pennsylvania Avenue Line (routes 32, 34, and 36).

1981 Changes
On January 4, 1981 two months after Addison Road station opened, route V12 was truncated to only operate between Potomac Avenue and Addison Road stations. The segment along Pennsylvania Avenue between Silver Hill Road and Penn Mar Shopping Center was replaced by the existing K12 and K19, and new routes V14, and V15. Route V11 was also discontinued on the same day. As a result of the change in V12's routing, V12 was renamed the Addison Road-Potomac Avenue Line.

New routes V14 and V15 would operate along the former V12 routing between Addison Road station and Penn Mar Shopping Center via the Coral Hills, District Heights, and Forestville neighborhoods, while also operating through Capitol Heights.

2001 Changes
On January 13, 2001 when Suitland station opened, the V12's routing was truncated even further to only operate between the Addison Road and Suitland stations. V12's routing between Addison Road and Potomac Avenue stations, was replaced by a new route V11 which would only operate on early Saturday morning trips prior to Metro's opening. As a result of these route changes, the Addison Road–Potomac Avenue Line, was renamed the District Heights–Suitland Line.

2007 Changes
On June 24, 2007, route V11 was discontinued as both the Blue & Orange Line trains began operating during the earlier times on Saturday mornings.

2014 Proposed Changes
In 2014, it was proposed for the P12 and V12 to swap routings between Addison Road station and the intersection of Addison Road and Walker Mill Road which will provide a more direct route for the P12 as the V12 is focused to become a neighborhood focused route. This was because swapping P12 and V12 routing on Wheeler Road and Shady Glen Drive will provide a more direct route for the P12 as the V12 is already designed to be a more neighborhood-focused service.

2015 Changes
On June 21, 2015 as part of Metro's "Better Bus Service" initiative, routes P12 and V12 swapped their routing between the intersection of Addison Road and Walker Mill Road and Addison Road station. Route P12 would operate along Addison Road while route V12 would operate along Shady Glen Drive, Walker Mill Road, and Central Avenue. Route P12 became a more direct route while route V12 a neighborhood-focused route.

2020 Proposed changes
On September 26, 2020, WMATA proposed to eliminate all route V12 Sunday service due to low federal funding. Route V12 has not operated on Sundays since March 15, 2020 due to Metro's response to the COVID-19 pandemic. However on March 14, 2021, route V12 Sunday service was restored.

References

V12